Time Again... Amy Grant Live is a live album by Christian music singer-songwriter Amy Grant, released on September 26, 2006 (see 2006 in music).

Time Again is Grant's first live album since the twin 1981 releases In Concert and In Concert Volume Two. This performance was recorded in the same city (Ft. Worth, Texas) as was the singer's first paid performance back in 1978. This also features an updated version of "In a Little While" from her 1982 album Age to Age.

Though originally released by Warner/Word Records, the album was re-released by EMI Records under exclusive license from Amy Grant Productions to Sparrow Records on March 18, 2014.

Track listing

Charts

Weekly charts

Awards
In 2007, the album won a Dove Award for Long Form Music Video of the Year at the 38th GMA Dove Awards.

References

Amy Grant live albums
Albums produced by Brown Bannister
2006 live albums
Word Records albums